Sławoszewo  (formerly German Neuhaus) is a settlement in the administrative district of Gmina Dobra, within Police County, West Pomeranian Voivodeship, in north-western Poland, close to the German border.

References

Villages in Police County